Otero de Escarpizo is a locality and minor local entity located in the municipality of Villaobispo de Otero, in León province, Castile and León, Spain. As of 2020, it has a population of 55.

Geography 
Otero de Escarpizo is located 56km west-southwest of León, Spain.

References

Populated places in the Province of León